Appius Claudius may refer to:

 Appius Claudius Caecus
 Appius Claudius Caudex
 Appius Claudius Crassus Inregillensis Sabinus
 Appius Claudius Pulcher (disambiguation)
 Appius Claudius Sabinus Inregillensis

See also